This is a list of high school athletic conferences in the Northeast Region of Ohio, as defined by the OHSAA. Because the names of localities and their corresponding high schools do not always match and because there is often a possibility of ambiguity with respect to either the name of a locality or the name of a high school, the following table gives both in every case, with the locality name first, in plain type, and the high school name second in boldface type. The school's team nickname is given last.

Akron City Series

 Akron Buchtel Griffins (1931-)
 Akron East Dragons (1918-)
 Akron Ellet Orangemen (1971-)
 Akron Firestone Falcons (1963-)
 Akron Garfield Golden Rams (2017–, known as Kenmore–Garfield 2017–2022)
 Akron North Vikings (1915-)

Former members
 Akron Central Wildcats (1915-1970, consolidated into Central-Hower)
 Akron Central-Hower Eagles (1970-2006, closed)
 Akron Hower Buccaneers (1927-1970, consolidated into Central-Hower)
 Akron Kenmore Cardinals (1929-2017, consolidated into Kenmore–Garfield)
 Akron Garfield Golden Rams (1926-2017, consolidated into Kenmore–Garfield)
 Akron South Cavaliers or Big Blue (1915-1980, closed)
 Akron West Cowboys (1915-1953, closed)

All-American Conference

Red Division
 Austintown-Fitch Falcons (2011- [Football, 2015-])
 Youngstown Boardman Spartans (2014- [Football, 2015-])
 Canfield Cardinals (2008-)
 Warren Howland Tigers (2008-)
 Warren G. Harding Raiders (2014- [Football, 2015-2019)

Former members
 Salem Quakers (2008–2011, to Northeastern Buckeye Conference) White Division 2008–11.
 Lisbon Beaver Local Beavers (played concurrently in OVAC, 2008–2013, to Buckeye 8 Athletic League) Red Division 2008–11, American Division 2011–13.
 Girard Indians (2008-2018, to Northeast 8 Conference)
 Hubbard Eagles (2008-2018, to Northeast 8 Conference)
 Jefferson Area Falcons (2011-2018, to Northeast 8 Conference)
 Cortland Lakeview Bulldogs (2008-2018, to Northeast 8 Conference)
 Niles McKinley Red Dragons (2008-2018, to Northeast 8 Conference)
 Poland Poland Seminary Bulldogs (2008-2018, to Northeast 8 Conference)
 Struthers Wildcats (2008-2018), to Northeast 8 Conference)
 Ashtabula Edgewood Warriors (2014-2019, to Chagrin Valley Conference)
 Ashtabula Lakeside Dragons (2015-2019, to Chagrin Valley Conference)
 Youngstown East Golden Bears (2014-19 [Football, 2015-19], to Steel Valley Conference)
 Brookfield Warriors (2014-2020, to Mahoning Valley Athletic Conference)
 Campbell Memorial Red Devils (2008-2020, to Mahoning Valley Athletic Conference)
 Champion Golden Flashes (2008-2020, to Mahoning Valley Athletic Conference)
 Columbiana Crestview Rebels (2019-2020, to Mahoning Valley Athletic Conference)
 Leavittsburg LaBrae Vikings (2008-2020, to Mahoning Valley Athletic Conference)
 Liberty Leopards (2008-2020, to Mahoning Valley Athletic Conference)
 Newton Falls Tigers (2008-2020, to Mahoning Valley Athletic Conference)
 Warren Warren G. Harding Raiders Football, 2015-2019, Moved to Freelance in 2020, then to the Steel Valley Conference in 2021)

Chagrin Valley Conference
Chagrin Division
 Chagrin Falls Tigers (1964-)
 Ashtabula Edgewood Warriors (2019-)
 Geneva Eagles (2015-)
 Kirtland Hornets (1996-)
 Ashtabula Lakeside Dragons (2019-)
 Pepper Pike Orange Lions (1964-1996, 1998-)1
 Perry Pirates (1996-)
 Chesterland West Geauga Wolverines (1963-1996, 1998-)1

Metro Division
 Brooklyn Hurricanes (2019-)
 Cuyahoga Heights Red Wolves (2005-)
 Independence Blue Devils (2005-)
 Rocky River Lutheran West Longhorns (2019-)
 Richmond Heights Spartans (2005-)
 Garfield Heights Trinity Trojans (2019-)
 Wickliffe Blue Devils (1980-)

Valley Division
 Beachwood Bison (2005-)
 Burton Berkshire Badgers (1996-)
 Middlefield Cardinal Huskies (1996-)
 Crestwood Red Devils (2020-)
 Orwell Grand Valley Mustangs (1998-2009, 2019-)
 Painesville Harvey Red Raiders (2009-)
 Gates Mills Hawken Hawks (1996-)
 Played 1996–98 in Western Reserve.

Future members
 Conneaut Spartans (joining in 2023)
 Madison Blue Streaks (joining in 2023)
 Jefferson Area Falcons (joining in 2023)

Former members
 Aurora Greenmen (1964-1983, to East Suburban, 1996–2015, to Suburban)
 Chardon Hilltoppers (1964-1980, to East Suburban, 1983–1996, to Premier Athletic Conference 1998)
 Fairport Harbor Fairport Harding Skippers (2005-2020)
 Bainbridge Kenston Bombers (1964-1996, to Western Reserve, 2005–2015, to Western Reserve)
 Newbury Black Knights (1998-2014, to Northeastern Athletic Conference; school closed in 2020)
 Solon Comets (1964-1996, to Western Reserve)
 Twinsburg Tigers (1964-1996, to Western Reserve)

Football divisions

Cleveland Senate Athletic League

 Cleveland John Adams Rebels (1923–95, 2006-)
 Cleveland Jane Addams Executives (1985-, no football)
 Cleveland Collinwood Railroaders (1924-)
 Cleveland East Technical Scarabs (1908-)
 Cleveland Glenville Tarblooders (1905-)
 Cleveland Max S. Hayes Lakers (1957-, no football)
 Cleveland John F. Kennedy Fighting Eagles (1966-)
 Cleveland Martin Luther King, Jr. Crusaders (1972-, no football)
 Cleveland Lincoln-West Wolverines (1961-)
 Cleveland John Marshall Lawyers (1936-)
 Cleveland James F. Rhodes Rams (1936-)
 Cleveland John Hay Hornets (1936-)

Former members:
 Cleveland Aviation Thunderbirds (1965–95)
 Cleveland Benedictine Bengals (1936–72)
 Cleveland Cathedral Latin Lions (1936–67)
 Cleveland Central Trojans (1904–52)
 Cleveland East Blue Bombers (1904-2010)
 Parma Heights Holy Name Green Wave (1936–67)
 Cleveland Lincoln Wolverines (1936–70)
 Cleveland St. Ignatius Wildcats (1936–67)
 Cleveland South Flyers (1904-2010)
 Cleveland West Cowboys (1904–61)
 Cleveland West Technical Warriors (1904–95)
 Cleveland Whitney M. Young Warriors (2004-2018)

Crown Conference

 Cleveland Heights Beaumont Blue Streaks (2021-)
 Mentor Lake Catholic Cougars (2021-)
 Chardon Notre Dame-Cathedral Latin Lions (2021-)
 Parma Padua Franciscan Bruins (2021-)
 Cuyahoga Falls Walsh Jesuit Warriors (2021-)

Eastern Buckeye Conference

 Alliance Aviators (2018-)
 Carrollton Warriors (2018-)
 Lexington Township Marlington Dukes (2018-)
 Minerva Lions (2018-)
 Salem Quakers (2018-)
 Beloit West Branch Warriors (2018-)

Eastern Ohio Athletic Conference
The Eastern Ohio Athletic Conference league was formed after the Inter-Tri County League split into two separate conferences for the 2017–18 school year.

 Columbiana Clippers (2017–)
 Lisbon David Anderson Blue Devils (2017–)
 East Palestine Bulldogs (2017–)
 Leetonia Bears (2017–)
 Salineville Southern  Local Indians (2017–)
 Hanoverton United Golden Eagles (2017–)
 Wellsville Tigers (2017–)
 Youngstown Valley Christian Eagles (2020–)

Former Members
 Toronto Red Knights (2017–2019, concurrent with OVAC)

Federal League

 Canton McKinley Bulldogs1 (2003–)
 Plain GlenOak Golden Eagles (1975–)
 Green Bulldogs (2015-)
 Jackson Polar Bears (1964–)
 Lake Blue Streaks (1987–)
 North Canton Hoover Vikings (1968–)
 Perry Panthers (1964–)

 Joined for all sports, besides football, in Fall 2003.  Joined conference for football in Fall 2004.

Former members
 Canton South Wildcats (1964–1990, to Northeastern Buckeye)
 Navarre Fairless Falcons (1964–1976, to All-Ohio)
 Canton Glenwood Eagles (1964–1975, consolidated into GlenOak)
 Lexington Marlington Dukes (1964–1985, to Senate)
 Magnolia Sandy Valley Cardinals (1964–1968, to Senate)
 Louisville Leopards (1968–1990, to Northeastern Buckeye)
 Canton Oakwood Golden Raiders (1968–1975, consolidated into GlenOak)
 Alliance Aviators (1983–2003, to Metro Athletic)
 New Philadelphia Quakers (1987–1997, to East Central Ohio)
 Canton Timken Trojans (1987–1995)
 Wooster Generals (1987–2003, to Ohio Cardinal)
 Austintown-Fitch Falcons1 (2003–2011, to All-American)
 Boardman Spartans1 (2003–2012, football only through 2014 season)

 Joined for all sports, besides football, in Fall 2003.  Joined conference for football in Fall 2004.

Great Lakes Conference
East Division
 Medina Buckeye Bucks (2019-)
 Parma Heights Holy Name Green Wave (2015-)
 Lakewood Rangers (2020-)
 Parma Normandy Invaders (2015-)
 Parma Redmen (2015-)
 Parma Heights Valley Forge Patriots (2015-)

West Division
 Bay Village Bay Rockets (2015-)
 Elyria Catholic Panthers (2015-)
 Fairview Park Fairview Warriors (2019-)
 North Olmsted Eagles (2021-)
 Rocky River Pirates (2015-)
 Westlake Demons (2021-)

Great Lakes League (ice hockey)
Ice hockey only league.  see 

 Gates Mills Gilmour Academy Lancers
 Parma Heights Holy Name Green Wave
 Mentor Lake Catholic Cougars
 Parma Padua Franciscan Bruins
Shaker Heights Shaker Heights High School Red Raiders
 Lakewood St. Edward Eagles
 Hunting Valley University School Preppers
 Cuyahoga Falls Walsh Jesuit Warriors

Greater Cleveland Conference

This conference has two incarnations. The first version lasted until 1998, and the second was begun by remaining members of the Northeast Ohio Conference in 2015.

Second version
 Brunswick Blue Devils (2015-)
 Euclid Panthers (2015-)
 Medina Bees (2015-)
 Mentor Cardinals (2015-)
 Solon Comets (2015-)
 Strongsville Mustangs (2015-)

First version (1950-98)

 Bedford Bearcats (1950-1998, to Lake Erie)
 Berea Braves (1950-1975, to Lake Erie)
 Euclid Panthers (1950-1998, to Lake Erie)
 Garfield Heights Bulldogs (1950-1968, to Lake Erie)
 Maple Heights Mustangs (1950-1998, to Lake Erie)
 Middleburg Heights Midpark Meteors (1950-1975, to Lake Erie)
 Willoughby Union Rangers (1950–58, split into Eastlake North and Willoughby South)
 Eastlake North Rangers (1958-1998, to Premier)
 Mentor Cardinals (1968-1993, to Lake Erie)
 Mayfield Wildcats (1968-1998, to Western Reserve)
 Willoughby South Rebels (1968-1998, to Premier)
 Lyndhurst Brush Arcs (1975-1998, to Western Reserve)
 Macedonia Nordonia Knights (1994-1997, to Western Reserve)

Independents
 Canton Central Catholic Crusaders
 Lyndhurst Brush Arcs
 Conneaut Spartans
 Willoughby Cornerstone Christian Patriots (no football)
 Beachwood Fuchs Mizrachi Mayhem (no football)
 Shaker Heights Hathaway Brown School Blazers (girls' only; no football)
 Columbiana Heartland Christian School Lions (no football)
 Canton Heritage Christian School Conquerors (no football)
 Cleveland Northeast Ohio College Preparatory Knights (no football)
 Lakewood St. Edward Eagles
 Cleveland St. Ignatius Wildcats
 Akron St. Vincent-St. Mary Fighting Irish
 Hunting Valley University Preppers
 Massillon Washington Tigers
 Louisville Leopards
 Akron Archbishop Hoban Knights 
 Cleveland Benedictine Bengals (boys' only)
 Cleveland St. Joseph Academy Jaguars (girls' only; no football)
 Cleveland Central Catholic Ironmen 
 Gates Mills Gilmour Academy Lancers 
 Rocky River Magnificat Blue Streaks (girls' only; no football)

Lake Effect Conference
Willoughby Andrews Osborne Academy Phoenix (2012-)
Elyria  First Baptist Christian Sabres (2012-)
Austinburg Grand River Eagles (2012-)
Chagrin Falls Geauga Grizzlies (2012-)
North Olmsted  HEARTS for Jesus Christ Guardians (2012-)
Cleveland Horizon Science Dragons (2012-)
North Ridgeville Lake Ridge Academy Royals (2016-)
Sagamore Hills Lawrence Lions (2012-)
Cleveland St. Martin De Porres Lions (2012-)

This conference does not include football. Only Cleveland St. Martin De Porres, Cleveland Horizon Science Academy,  North Ridgeville Lake Ridge Academy, and Willoughby Andrews Osborne Academy are current members of the OHSAA.

Lake Erie League
Bedford Bearcats (1998-)
Cleveland Heights Tigers (1928-)
 Garfield Heights Bulldogs (1968-2007, to Northeast Ohio [Football 1968–86, 1993-2007])(2020-)
Lorain Titans (2010-)
Maple Heights Mustangs (1998-)
 Shaker Heights Red Raiders (1923-2012, to Northeast Ohio, 2020-)
East Cleveland Shaw Cardinals (1928-)
Warrensville Heights Tigers (1993-, [Football 1993–2014, 2016-]) 

Former members
Cleveland Heights Lutheran East Falcons (2017-2019) (all sports except football)
 Elyria Pioneers (1923–54, to Buckeye Conference. 1997–2003, to Pioneer)
 Lakewood Rangers (1923-2007, to Northeast Ohio)
 Lorain Steelmen (1923–54, to Buckeye Conference)
 Rocky River Pirates (1923–37, to Southwestern)
 Parma Redmen (1951-2003, to Pioneer)
 Lyndhurst Brush Arcs (1962–75, to Greater Cleveland)
 Parma Heights Valley Forge Patriots (1962-2003, to Pioneer)
 Parma Normandy Invaders (1968-2003, to Pioneer)
 Berea Braves (1975–79, to Pioneer)
 Middleburg Heights Midpark Meteors (1975–79, to Pioneer)
 Mentor Cardinals (1993-2011, to Northeast Ohio)
 Euclid Panthers (1998-2015, to Greater Cleveland)
 Lorain Admiral King Admirals (2002–10, consolidated into Lorain)
 Lorain Southview Saints (2002–10, consolidated into Lorain)
 Warren Warren G. Harding Raiders (2010-2013, to All-American, football through 2014 season)

Lorain County League/Conference
Originally began in 1924 as one of the small-school county leagues, the league survived the consolidation wave until 1961, when the schools who weren't already aligned with the Inland Conference joined the Lakeland Conference. The conference revived itself in 1986, as the Lakeland collapsed, and the schools banded together for roughly two decades until the schools split, this time to help form the Patriot Athletic and West Shore conferences. The third and current version of the league formed in 2019 from the remnants of the Patriot Athletic Conference.

Third Version (Lorain County League, 2019-)
 Sullivan Black River Pirates (2019-)
 Sheffield Brookside Cardinals (2019-)
 Lorain Clearview Clippers (2019-)
 Columbia Station Columbia Raiders (2019-)
 Oberlin Firelands Falcons (2019-)
 LaGrange Keystone Wildcats (2019-)
 Oberlin Phoenix (2019-)
 Wellington Dukes (2019-)

Second Version (Lorain County Conference, 1986-2005)
 Avon Eagles (1986–2005, to West Shore)
 Sheffield Brookside Cardinals (1986–2005, to Patriot)
 Lorain Clearview Clippers (1986–2005, to Patriot)
 Oberlin Firelands Falcons (1986–2005, to West Shore)
 LaGrange Keystone Wildcats (1986–2005, to Patriot)
 Oberlin Indians (1986–2005, to Patriot)
 Wellington Dukes (1986–2005, to Patriot)
 Elyria West Wolverines (1986–1996, school closed, consolidated into Elyria)
 Grafton Midview Middies (1996–2005, to West SHore)

First Version (Lorain County League, 1924–61)
 Avon Eagles1 (1924–61, to Inland)
 Avon Lake Shoremen (1924–1961, to Lakeland)
 Belden Bees (1924–55, consolidated into Midview)
 Brighton Bears (1924–52, consolidated into Wellington)
 Sheffield Brookside Cardinals1 (1924–61, to Inland)
 Brownhelm Bombers (1924–52, consolidated into Firelands)
 Kipton Camden Knights (1924–52, consolidated into Firelands)
 Columbia Station Columbia Raiders1 (1924–61, to Inland)
 Grafton Eaton Eels (1924–55, consolidated into Midview)
 Grafton Comets (1924–55, consolidated into Midview)
 Henrietta Hawks (1924–52, consolidated into Firelands)
 LaGrange Wildcats (1924–59, consolidated into Keystone)
 North Ridgeville Rangers (1924–27, to NOAL, 1933–61, to Lakeland)
 Penfield Bombers (1924–59, consolidated into Keystone)
 South Amherst Cavaliers1 (1924–61, to Inland)
 Wellington Dukes (1924–27, to NOAL)
 Lorain Clearview Clippers (1928–38, to NOAL, 1947–53, to Lakeland)
 Oberlin Firelands Falcons1 (1952–61, to Inland)
 Grafton Midview Middies (1955–61, to Lakeland)
 Lagrange Keystone Wildcats2 (1959–61)

 Concurrent with Inland Conference 1957–61.
 Concurrent with Inland Conference 1959–61.

Division Alignments

Mahoning Valley Athletic Conference
The Mahoning Valley Athletic Conference was formed after the Inter-Tri County League split into two separate conferences for the 2017–18 school year. In 2020, the former Blue tier of the All-American Conference joined to create a new Grey tier.

Grey Tier
 Brookfield Warriors (2020-)
 Campbell Memorial Red Devils (2020–)
 Warren Champion Golden Flashes (2020–)
 Columbiana Crestview Rebels (2020–)
 Garrettsville Garfield G-Men (2021–)
 Leavittsburg LaBrae Vikings (2020–)
 Youngstown Liberty Leopards (2020–)
 Newton Falls Tigers (2020–)

Scarlet Tier
 North Jackson Jackson-Milton Blue Jays (2017–)
 Lowellville Rockets (2017–)
 McDonald Blue Devils (2017–)
 Sebring McKinley Trojans (2017–)
 Mineral Ridge Rams (2017–)
 New Middletown Springfield Tigers (2017–)
 Atwater Waterloo Vikings (2017–)
 Berlin Center Western Reserve Blue Devils (2017–)

Metro Athletic Conference
Westfield Township Cloverleaf Colts (2020-)
Coventry Comets (2020-)
Brimfield Field Falcons (2020-)
Norton Panthers (2020-)
Ravenna Ravens (2020-)
Lakemore Springfield Spartans (2020-)
Streetsboro Rockets (2020-)
Cuyahoga Falls Woodridge Bulldogs (2020-)

Northeast 8 Conference
 Girard Indians (2018-)
 Hubbard Eagles (2018-)
 Jefferson Area Falcons (2018-)
 Cortland Lakeview Bulldogs (2018-)
 Niles McKinley Red Dragons (2018-)
 Poland Poland Seminary Bulldogs (2018-)
 Canfield South Range Raiders (2018-)
 Struthers Wildcats (2018-)

Northeastern Athletic Conference

Stripes Division

 Ashtabula St. John Fighting Heralds (2022-)
 Bristolville Bristol Panthers (2002-)
 Southington Chalker Wildcats (2002-)
 Lordstown Red Devils (2002-)
 North Bloomfield Bloomfield Cardinals (2002-)
 Windham Bombers (2013-)

Stars Division

Andover Pymatuning Valley Lakers (2002-) 
Cortland Maplewood Rockets (2002-)
Fairport Harbor Fairport Harding Skippers (2020-)
Kinsman Badger Braves (2003-)
 Vienna Mathews Mustangs (2003-) 
FOOTBALL ONLY

 Andover Pymatuning Valley Lakers (2009-)
 Ashtabula St. John Fighting Heralds (2022-) 
 Fairport Harbor Fairport Harding Skippers (2020-)
 Vienna Mathews Mustangs (2009-)
 Windham Bombers (2013-)

Former Members
 Thompson Ledgemont Redskins (2008-2015; school closed following a territory transfer to Berkshire Local Schools in Burton)
 Orwell Grand Valley Mustangs (2009-2019; left for Chagrin Valley Conference)
 Newbury Black Knights (2014-2020; school closed following a territory transfer to West Geauga Local Schools in Chesterland)
 Southington Chalker Wildcats (football only - 2009-2020; School announced in 2021 that their football program would be suspended due to low numbers. They have signed a 3-year deal to become a club sport only playing a Junior Varsity and Freshman schedule.

Portage Trail Conference

 Lake Township Lake Center Christian Tigers (no football) (2015–)
Mogadore Wildcats (2005–)
 Rootstown Rovers (2005–)
 Palmyra Southeast Pirates (2005−)
 Louisville St. Thomas Aquinas Knights (2020−)
 Warren John F. Kennedy Eagles (2020–)

Former members

 Garrettsville James A. Garfield G-Men (2005–2021, to Mahoning Valley Athletic)
 East Canton Hornets (2005–2013, to Inter-Valley)
 Kent Roosevelt Rough Riders (2005–2015, to Suburban League-American)
 Atwater Waterloo Vikings (2005–2017, to Mahoning Valley Athletic)
 Windham Bombers (2005–2013, to Northeastern Athletic)
Lodi Cloverleaf Colts (2015–2020, to Metro Athletic Conference)
Coventry Comets (2005–2020, to Metro Athletic Conference)
Brimfield Field Falcons (2005–2020, to Metro Athletic Conference)
Norton Panthers (2005–2020, to Metro Athletic Conference)
Ravenna Ravens (2005–2020, to Metro Athletic Conference)
Lakemore Springfield Spartans (2005–2020, to Metro Athletic Conference)
Streetsboro Rockets (2005–2020, to Metro Athletic Conference)
Cuyahoga Falls Woodridge Bulldogs (2005–2020, to Metro Athletic Conference)
 Youngstown Valley Christian Eagles (2017–2020, to Eastern Ohio Athletic Conference)

Principals Athletic Conference

Also known as PAC-8
Canton Township Canton South Wildcats (2022-)
 Cuyahoga Falls Cuyahoga Valley Christian Royals (2001-)
 Navarre Fairless Falcons (1989-)
 New Franklin Manchester Panthers (1989-)
 Lawrence Northwest Indians (2017-)
 Orrville Red Riders (2016-)
 Wooster Triway Titans (2005-)
 Tuscarawas Tuslaw Mustangs (1989-)

Former Members
 Coventry Comets (1989–97, to Independent; 2001–05, to Portage Trail-Metro)
 East Canton Hornets (1989-2005, to Portage Trail-County)
 Gnadenhutten Indian Valley Braves (1992–96, 2007–17, to Inter-Valley Conference)
 Magnolia Sandy Valley Cardinals (1989-2001, to Inter-Valley)
 Canton Timken Trojans (2005–15, school closed)
 Zoarville Tuscarawas Valley Trojans (1989-2017, to Inter-Valley Conference)

Southwestern Conference

 Avon Eagles (2015-)
 Avon Lake Shoremen (1964-)
 Berea-Midpark Titans (2013-)
 Elyria Pioneers (2021-)
 Grafton Midview Middies (2015-)
 North Ridgeville Rangers (2015-)
 Olmsted Falls Bulldogs (1954-)
 Amherst Marion L. Steele Comets (1947–1958 as Amherst, to Lakeland, 1986-)

Former members 
 Berea Braves (1937–1950, to Greater Cleveland, 2005–13, consolidated into Berea-Midpark)
 Oberlin Indians (1937–1964, to Lakeland)
 Rocky River Pirates (1937–2005, to West Shore)
 Fairview Warriors (1940–2005, to West Shore)
 Lorain Clearview Clippers (1945–1954, to Lakeland)
 Wellington Dukes (1945–1954, to Lakeland)
 Medina Bees (1947–1986, to Pioneer)
 Bay Rockets (1954–2005, to West Shore)
 Brecksville-Broadview Heights Bees (2005-2015, to Suburban)
 Middleburg Heights and Brook Park Midpark Meteors (2005-2013, consolidated into Berea-Midpark)
 Lakewood Rangers (2015-2020, to Great Lakes)

Steel Valley Conference
The original SVC existed from 1949 to 2009. 2019 marks the start of the second incarnation of the Steel Valley Conference.
 Youngstown Cardinal Mooney Cardinals (1970-2009, 2019-)
 Youngstown Chaney Cowboys (2003–09 [independent in football], 2019-)
 Youngstown East Golden Bears (2007–09 [independent in football], 2019-)
 Youngstown Ursuline Fighting Irish (1970-2009, 2019-)
 Warren Warren G. Harding Raiders (football only, 2021-)
Former Members
 Austintown-Fitch Falcons (1949-2003)
 Girard Indians (1949–71)
 Hubbard Eagles (1949–80)
 Niles McKinley Red Dragons (1949–57, 1982–85)
 Campbell Memorial Red Devils (1949–80)
 Struthers Wildcats (1949–79)
 Boardman Spartans (1951-2003)
 Brookfield Warriors (1959–68)
 Howland Tigers (1975–85)
 Warren Western Reserve Raiders (1980–85)
 Warren Warren G. Harding Panthers (1982–85, 1991-2009)
 Warren John F. Kennedy Eagles (2003–09, Independent in football)
 Youngstown Rayen Tigers (2003–07, no football, school closed)
 Youngstown Wilson Presidents (2003–07, no football, school closed)

Suburban League

American Division
 Aurora Greenmen (2015–)
 Barberton Magics (2005–2011, 2015–)
 Copley Indians (1949–present)
 Cuyahoga Falls Black Tigers (2015–)
 Granger Highland Hornets (1976–)
 Revere Minutemen (1957–)
 Kent Roosevelt Rough Riders (2015–)
 Tallmadge Blue Devils (1990–)

National Division
 Brecksville Bees (2015–)
 Hudson Explorers (1949-1997, 2015–)
 Macedonia Nordonia Knights (1947–1973, 2011–)
 North Royalton Bears (2015–)
 Stow-Munroe Falls Bulldogs (2015–)
 Twinsburg Tigers (1957–1964, 2015–)
 Wadsworth Grizzlies (1984–)

Former members
 Green Bulldogs (1949–2015, to Federal)
 New Franklin Manchester Panthers (1949–1976, to All-Ohio)
 Mogadore Wildcats (1957–1968, to Portage County)
 Cuyahoga Falls Woodridge Bulldogs (1957–1978, to Portage County)
 Coventry Comets (1969–1983, to All-Ohio)
 Norton Panthers (1972–2005, to Portage Trail-Metro)
 Brimfield Field Falcons (1978–1990, to Portage County)
 Westfield Cloverleaf Colts (1997–2015, to Portage Trail-Metro)

Wayne County Athletic League

 Doylestown Chippewa Chipps (known as Doylestown until 1971; 1924–)
 Dalton Bulldogs (1924–)
 Jeromesville Hillsdale Falcons (1970–)
 West Salem Northwestern Huskies (1951–)
 Creston Norwayne Bobcats (1953–)
 Rittman Indians (1924–1937, 1961–)
 Smithville Smithies (1924–)
 Apple Creek Waynedale Golden Bears (1955–)

Former members
 Apple Creek Aces (1924–1955, consolidated into Waynedale)
 Big Prairie Bobcats (1924–1937, to Holmes County League)
 Burbank Bombers (1924–1953, consolidated into Norwayne)
 Chester Pups (1924–1951, consolidated into Northwestern)
 Congress Senators (1924–1951, consolidated into Northwestern)
 Creston Panthers (1924–1951, consolidated into Norwayne)
 Fredericksburg Freddies (1924–1955, consolidated into Waynedale)
 Marshallville Tigers (1924–1938, consolidated into Dalton, transferred to Smithville 1955)
 Mount Eaton Paint Township Pirates (1924–1955, consolidated into Waynedale)
 Shreve Trojans (1924–1963, consolidated into Triway)
 Sterling Eagles (1924–1953, consolidated into Norwayne)
 West Salem Clippers (1924–1951, consolidated into Northwestern)
 Wooster Triway Titans (1963–1970, to Chippewa Conference)

Western Reserve Conference
The Western Reserve Conference is the name of four separate conferences (including two that ran simultaneously for a few years) in Northeastern Ohio.

Fourth Version (2015-)
This version was formed as most of the Premier Athletic Conference combined with two schools from the Northeast Ohio Conference, and one from the Chagrin Valley Conference.

 Chardon Hilltoppers (2015-)
 Auburn/Bainbridge Kenston Bombers (2015-)
 Mayfield Wildcats (2015-)
 Madison Blue Streaks (2015-)
 Eastlake North Rangers (2015-)
 Painesville Riverside Beavers (2015-)
 Willoughby South Rebels (2015-)

Third Version (1996–2007)
This version was formed in 1996, as the Metro League merged with five schools from the Chagrin Valley Conference. This version of the WRC would combine with the Pioneer Conference to become the Northeast Ohio Conference.
 Barberton Magics (1996–2005)
 Cuyahoga Falls Black Tigers (1996–2007)
 Bainbridge Kenston Bombers (1996–2005)
 Pepper Pike Orange Lions (1996–1998)
 Ravenna Ravens (1996–2005)
 Kent Roosevelt Rough Riders (1996–2005)
 Solon Comets (1996–2007)
 Stow-Munroe Falls Bulldogs (1996–2007)
 Twinsburg Tigers (1996–2007)
 Chester West Geauga Wolverines (1996–1998)
 Hudson Explorers (1997–2007)
 Macedonia Nordonia Knights (1997–2007)
 Lyndhurst Brush Arcs (1998–2007)
 Mayfield Wildcats (1998–2007)

Second Version (1920s-68) 
This version started as the Lake County League in the early 1920s, taking the WRC name in 1948 (despite the first WRC still existing). The league would last another 20 years before folding in 1968.

 Fairport Harbor Fairport Harding Skippers (1920s-28, to Lake Shore League, 1948–51, to Northeastern Conference, 1962–68, to Lake Shore League)
 Painesville Harvey Red Raiders (1920s-28, to Lake Shore League)
 Kirtland Hornets (1920s-60, to Great Lakes Athletic Conference)
 Madison Blue Streaks (1920s-68, to Lake Shore League)
 Perry Pirates (1920s-68, to Lake Shore League)
 Willoughby Union Rangers (1920s-28, to Lake Shore League)
 Wickliffe Blue Devils (1920s-57, to Northeastern Conference)
 Chardon Hilltoppers (1948–64, to Chagrin Valley Conference)
 Painesville Riverside Beavers (1949–51, to NortheasternConference)
 Conneaut Trojans (1951–59, to Northeastern Conference)
 Ashtabula Harbor Mariners (1951–65, to Northeastern Conference)
 Lakeland Rowe Vikings (1951–64, consolidated into Conneaut)
 Jefferson Falcons (1954–68, to Northeastern Conference)
 Geneva Spencer Wildcats (1957–61, consolidated into Geneva)
 Edgewood Warriors (1962–65, to Northeastern Conference)

First Version (1919-51) 
This league was originally the Trolley League until 1931, when it took the name, Western Reserve League (Western Reserve Conference).

 Cuyahoga Falls Black Tigers (1919–29, 1937–51)
 Kenmore Cardinals (1919–29)
 Ravenna Ravens (1919–51)
 Kent Roosevelt Rough Riders (1919–51)
 Kent State Blue Devils (1919–37)
 Bedford Bearcats (1921-2?)
 Medina Battling Bees (19??-31)
 Orrville Red Riders (1920–24, 1926–29, 1932–38)
 Ellet Orangemen (1931–37)
 Wadsworth Grizzlies (1931–41)
 Akron St. Vincent Fighting Irish (1938–48)

Defunct conferences

See also
Ohio High School Athletic Association

Notes and references